Liskeard North is an electoral division of Cornwall in the United Kingdom and returns one member to sit on Cornwall Council. The current Councillor is Nick Craker, a Conservative.

Extent
Liskeard North covers the north of Liskeard, including the suburbs of Trembraze and Addington. The division covers 690 hectares in total.

Election results

2017 election

2013 election

2009 election

References

Liskeard
Electoral divisions of Cornwall Council